5ive Style is the eponymously titled debut studio album of 5ive Style, released on September 12, 1995, by Sub Pop.

Track listing

Personnel 
Adapted from the 5ive Style liner notes.

5ive Style
Leroy Bach – bass guitar, guitar, keyboards
Bill Dolan – guitar
John Herndon – drums, painting
Jeremy Jacobsen – keyboards

Production and additional personnel
Jeff Kleinsmith – design
John McEntire – mixing, recording
Casey Rice – mixing, recording

Release history

References

External links 
 

1995 debut albums
Five Style albums
Sub Pop albums